The 1991/92 NTFL season was the 71st season of the Northern Territory Football League (NTFL).

St Marys have won there 18th premiership title while defeating the Darwin Buffaloes in the grand final by 31 points.

Grand Final

References

Northern Territory Football League seasons
NTFL